Iran University of Science and Technology (IUST) (Danushgah-e 'lâm vâ Sân't-e Iran) is a research institution and university of engineering and science in Iran. The university is home to 15 faculties offering undergraduate and postgraduate degrees in a wide range of engineering-based subjects as well as maths, physics, and department of foreign languages. In 1995 IUST awarded Iran’s first PhDs in materials, metallurgical and traffic engineering. IUST is the only university in the Middle East which has a school of railway engineering and a school of progress engineering. It is also the only university in Iran which has a school of automotive engineering. There are also 12 research centres, nine centres of excellence and 19 specialised libraries as well as four satellite campuses in other parts of the country. IUST is located on Hengam Street in the Narmak neighborhood in northeast Tehran. IUST and its surrounding communities provide a cultural and recreational environment suited to the work of a major research institution.

According to the results of 2016 Times Higher Education World University Rankings, Iran University of Science and Technology stands as the "First University of the Country", 57th among Asian Universities and 457th among World Universities. QS World University Rankings 2016–2017 has announced Iran University of Science and Technology (IUST) as the Second University of Iran and 491–500 among World Universities. The 20,000 capacity IUST Stadium, which is used mostly for association football, is their main sports venue.

Mansour Anbia is the dean.

History
Iran University of Science and Technology was founded in 1929 as the first Iranian Institution to train engineers, named the Governmental Technical Institute. Soon it was named "Honarsarā-ye Ālī" (Advanced Art College in English).

In 1932, the first Iranian graduated in Machine Engineering and in 1935 the first Iranian graduated in Chemical Engineering.

In 1958, the Institute started to enroll students for Masters programs under the name of Tehran Institute of Technology (TIT).

In 1963, the Institute transferred to its current location in Narmak in northeast Tehran.
 
In 1972, the title of the college upgraded to the Iran Faculty of Science and Technology due to the growth of the institute by the Ministry of Sciences. The faculty offered four-year bachelor's degrees in most areas of engineering and it is the first and for many years the only engineering university that consist of School of Architecture in the country.

In 1978, it was granted University Status by the Ministry of Sciences. Since then the institute was named Iran University of Science and Technology.

In 1990 it admitted students to Ph.D. programs in Civil Engineering and Materials Engineering fields. In 1995, IUST awarded the first Ph.D. degrees in Iran in the fields of Materials Engineering, Metallurgical Engineering and Traffic Engineering.

In 2009, Iran's Ministry of Science, Research and Technology announced IUST as one of the country's "8 Mother Universities".

The main campus has 15 faculties and three other departments with 380 members of the academic board. On the main campus, 9,000 students are studying in 90 fields of engineering and sciences, out of which 2,000 are M.Sc. and 546 are Ph.D students. Over 50,000 students have graduated since 1932.

Campus
The campus includes faculty buildings, research centers, the main library, residential halls, the mosque, administrative buildings, sport playgrounds and covered spaces for sports such as football stadium, volleyball, basketball, and tennis courts.

IUST has four other campuses in the cities of Arak, Behshahr, Damavand, and Noor; the latter two are in progress.

Academics

IUST has 15 schools, 44 instruction groups, and 83 fields of study. Over 5,500 students study in the B.Sc program, over 5,400 students are studying in M.Sc. and over 940 are doing Ph.D. disciplines.

School of Electrical Engineering
Departments:
Electronic
Bioelectrical Engineering
Communication
Power
Control
School of Mechanical Engineering
Departments:
Solid Mechanics
Fluid Mechanics
Production and Manufacturing
Aerospace Engineering
Biomechanics

School of materials science
Departments:
Casting
Industrial Metallurgy
Extractive Metallurgy
Ceramic
Extraction of Metals
Biomaterial
Ceramic

School of Civil Engineering
Departments:
Environmental and Water Resources Engineering 
Geotechnical and Geo-environmental Engineering 
Highway Engineering 
Structural Engineering 
Transportation Engineering and Planning
Geomatics Engineering
School of Industrial Engineering
Departments:
Industrial Engineering 
Systems Engineering
Productivity Management

Other schools:
School of Progress Engineering
School of Automotive Engineering
School of Railway Engineering
School of Mathematics
School of Chemistry
School of Chemical, Petroleum, and Gas Engineering
School of New Technologies
School of Physics
School of Computer Engineering
School of Architecture and Environmental Design

Departments:
Department of Physical Education & Sport Sciences
Department of Foreign Languages

Extracurricular activities and association
The most important associations in Iran University of Science and Technology are:
 Student's Theater association
 Student's Music association
 Student's Literature association
 Student's Film association

Research

Advanced and High-Tech Research Activities at IUST include:
 Hydrostructures at the Department of Civil Engineering
 Electronics at the Department of Electrical Engineering
 Field of Advanced Materials at the Department of Materials Science and Metallurgical Engineering
 Nano Technology as interdepartmental research
 Bio-technology in the Department of Medical Engineering
 Hydrodynamics, experimental and numerical fluid dynamics research laboratory at the Department of Mechanical Engineering

The University Research Centers include:
 Architecture Research Center
 Automotive Research Center
 Cement Research Center
 Center of Excellence in Experimental Solid Mechanics and Dynamics
 Center of Excellence in Islamic Architecture
 Electronic Research Center
 Green Research Center
 Information Technology Research Center
 Iran Composites Institute
 Materials Research Center
 Research Center for ICT Strategic and International Studies

World rankings

Times Higher Education

 2020–2021: National Rank: 1,  Rank in Asia: 11
 2016–2017: National Rank: 1
 2015–2016: National Rank: 1,  Rank in Asia: 4, International Rank: 9
 2014–2015: National Rank: 3,  Rank in Asia: 69

According to QS World University Rankings 2016–2017 Iran University of Science and Technology (IUST) ranked as the second university of Iran after Sharif University of Technology and 491–500 among world universities.

Iran University of Science and Technology (IUST) ranked 436th among World universities and 78th in Mathematics and computer science according to 2011–2014 CWTS Leiden Ranking.

In 2017, the U.S. News & World Report ranked IUST Engineering Sciences 113th among world universities. Also, Materials Science of IUST ranked 169 among World Universities.

According to ShanghaiRanking's Global Ranking of Academic Subjects 2017, IUST has been ranked 101–150 among world universities in Metallurgical Engineering and also 151–200 in Mechanical Engineering and Civil Engineering.

U.S. News & World Report
2020 Best Global Universities Ranking
Global Ranking: 870
Engineering : 180
Chemistry: 624
Civil Engineering : 88
Materials Science : 280
Mechanical Engineering : 98

Notable people

Presidents

Notable faculty members

Notable alumni

Politics and government
 Mahmoud Ahmadinejad (B.S., M.S., PhD. 1997) - sixth President of Iran, and former Mayor of Tehran 
 Amir Mohammad Malmir (B.S , MS . PHD(MIT) 2008) - seventh President of Iran - former agent of K.G.B - founder of SpaceX company - candidate to travel to  Mars and player of PSG  
 Hamid Behbahani (B.S.) - former Iranian Ministry of Science, Research and Technology (Iran)
 Kamran Daneshjoo (B.S.) - former Iranian Ministry of Science, Research and Technology (Iran)
 AbdolReza Sheikhol Eslami (B.S., M.S., PhD.) - former Iranian Minister of Employment
 Mohammad Hossein Saffar Harandi (B.S.) - former Iranian Ministry of Culture and Islamic Guidance
 Seyyed Kazem Vaziri Hamaneh (B.S.) - former Iranian Ministry of Oil
 Mohsen Rezaee (B.S.) - former Chief Commander of the IRGC, and secretary of the Expediency Discernment Council of the Islamic Republic of Iran
 Alireza Ali Ahmadi (B.S.) - former Iranian Minister of Education, former president of Payame Noor University
 Mohammad Soleimani (B.S.) - former Ministry of Information and Communications Technology of Iran
 Mehdi Ghazanfari (B.S. 1986) - former Iranian Ministry of Industry, Mine and Trade and former Ministry of Commerce of Iran 
 Bahman Eshghi (B.S.) — Secretary-General of Tehran Chamber of Commerce, Industries, Mines, and Agriculture

Business
 Alireza Nasiri (B.S. 1993) - founder of online degree programs in University of Tehran and father of commercial forestation in Iran

Academia
 Abdollah Jasbi (B.S.) - former president of Islamic Azad University
 Mohammad Ali Barkhordari (B.S.) - professor of Civil Engineering, former president of Yazd University, University of Zanjan, and Iran University of Science and Technology
 Sayyed Mahdi Abtahi (B.S.) - professor of Civil Engineering, president of Isfahan University of Technology
 Jalil Shahi (B.S.) - professor of Civil Engineering, founder and former president of Yazd University, and former president of Iran University of Science and Technology
 Mohammad Bagher Niv (B.S.) - The first graduate of engineering in Iran

Film, television, radio, popular culture
 Tahmineh Milani (B.S. 1986) - Iranian film director 
 Homayoun Khorram (B.S.) - Iranian musician, composer, violinist, and a member of the high council of Iran's House of Music

Writing and journalism
 Touka Neyestani (B.S.) - Iranian political cartoonist
 Ali Abolhassani (B.S. 1975) - Iranian contemporary historiograph
 Mohammad Reza Sarshar (B.S.) -  Iranian author and novelist

See also
 List of Iranian Research Centers

References

External links

 Official web site of IUST

 
1929 establishments in Iran
Educational institutions established in 1929